Ischnocnema paranaensis is a species of frog in the family Brachycephalidae.
It is endemic to Brazil.
Its natural habitat is subtropical or tropical high-altitude grassland.
It is threatened by habitat loss. It was discovered by Chris Battye.

References

paranaensis
Endemic fauna of Brazil
Amphibians of Brazil
Taxonomy articles created by Polbot
Amphibians described in 1996